A money shot is a moving or stationary visual element of a film, video, television broadcast, or print publication that is disproportionately expensive to produce or is perceived as essential to the overall importance or revenue-generating potential of the work.

Cinema 
Originally a broad term used generally in film-making, the "money shot" was simply the scene that cost the most money to produce. In general, a money shot (also called a money-making shot) is a provocative, sensational, or memorable sequence in a film, on which the film's commercial performance is perceived to depend. The scene may or may not be a special-effects sequence, but may be counted on to become a selling point for the film. For example, in an action thriller, an expensive special-effects sequence of a dam bursting might be considered the money shot of the film. Many filmmakers read a script and look for the most dramatic or climactic moment—the money shot—in the proposed film. Even though the costs or technical challenges of filming such an impressive scene may be huge, producers and directors will do whatever it takes to get that shot completed. It is because of its box-office importance and expensive set-up, that this climactic scene is often referred to as a money shot.

More broadly, it can be any notably dramatic or emotional footage. Conversely, Rich Evans of Red Letter Media, offered up the term "coupon shot" for money shots that are anticlimactic or otherwise poorly executed on the channel's Best of the Worst series.

Pornographic films 

The term has become known in its narrower, genre specific context, namely meaning cum shot in pornography, both film and photo. Referring to the ejaculation scene as a 'money shot' has been attributed to producers paying the male actors extra for it. According to Steven Ziplow, author of The Film Maker's Guide to Pornography, "the cum shot, or, as some refer to it, 'the money shot', is the most important element in the movie and that everything else (if necessary) should be sacrificed at its expense." It has also been argued that this is the filmed moment that the audience has paid to see. In her book Hard Core, Linda Williams argues that the money shot is not simply desired in and of itself, but proves to the audience that the sex is real.

References 

Film and video terminology
Cinematic techniques
Pornography terminology